Chop suey is a dish in American Chinese cuisine.

Chop suey may also refer to:

Cuisine
 American chop suey, a name for an American dish consisting of ground beef, elbow macaroni and a tomato based sauce

Films
 Chop Suey, a 2000 film by Bruce Weber
 Chop Suey & Co. (1919 film), U.S. comedic short film

Music

Albums
Chop Suey, an album by DJ Yoda

Songs
 "Chop Suey", a musical number in the stage musical Flower Drum Song
 "Chop Suey", a song by Mr. Flash
 "Chop Suey", a song by the Ramones, from the soundtrack of the film Get Crazy
 "Chop Suey!" (song), a song by System of a Down
 "Cornet Chop Suey", an instrumental by Louis Armstrong

Other uses
 Chop Suey (painting), a 1929 painting by Edward Hopper
 Chop Suey (video game), a 1995 point-and-click adventure game
 Wonton font or Chop-suey, a typeface mimicking Chinese characters
 Chopsuey or Experiment 621, a character from the Lilo & Stitch franchise

See also
 Chop socky